Stoney Creek is a community in the city of Hamilton in the Canadian province of Ontario. It was officially a city from 1984 to 2001, when it was amalgamated with the rest of the cities of the Regional Municipality of Hamilton–Wentworth.

The community of Stoney Creek is located on the south shore of western Lake Ontario, east of downtown Hamilton, into which feed the watercourses of Stoney Creek as well as several other minor streams. The historic area, known as the "Old Town", is below the Niagara Escarpment.

Stoney Creek experienced an increase in residential growth, particularly in the lower city in the 1970s and 1980s, and in the west mountain in the 1990s and 2000s, but most of the land mass of Stoney Creek remains agricultural. The communities of Elfrida, Fruitland, Tapleytown, Tweedside, Vinemount, and Winona serve as distinct reminders of the agricultural legacy of Stoney Creek and Saltfleet Township.

History 

Stoney Creek was first inhabited by Canadian First Nations and later explored by French-Canadian fur traders before the area was settled by Loyalists fleeing the American Revolution in the late 1700s. The name 'Stoney Creek' is derived from the area's central watercourse, Stoney Creek, which runs from the Devil's Punchbowl, in the Niagara Escarpment, to Lake Ontario. It is often taken for granted the 'Stoney Creek' is a description of the creek's rockiness although some evidence suggests the name comes from an early settler Edmund Stoney.

On 6 June 1813 the settlement garnered some notability during the War of 1812 as the site of the eponymous battle. After being informed of American troop movements by Billy Green, a local hero and the namesake of Billy Green elementary school, British forces overwhelmed the Americans in a surprise night attack.

Demographics
According to the 2001 census the population of Stoney Creek was 59,327 up 5.5 per cent from the 1996 census. Children under 14 years of age totaled 19.4% while those in retirement age constituted 12.6% of the total population. Some 25.94% or a quarter of the population was foreign born. The census showed that Stoney Creek was 92.72% white (European), (of which 55% had British or Irish origins, 16% Italian, 21% Croatian,  Polish, Serbian, Ukrainian etc.), 3.0% South Asian, 1.0% Black, 1.0% mixed race, 0.6% Chinese. As of the 2006 census, Stoney Creek's population had risen to 62,292. As of the 2021 census, Stoney Creek's population had risen to 112,028. The median age of the population was 43.2.

Economy
The temperate environment on the Niagara Peninsula's western end made the Stoney Creek area in eastern Wentworth County to be known for fruit growing. In recent decades, as the quality and reputation of Ontario wines grew, Stoney Creek became part of the fringes of the Niagara winery region.

Agriculture continued to be the major employer for decades, only supplanted by others as community growth brought it into closer contact with Hamilton and the great conurbation of the Golden Horseshoe. Stoney Creek became a centre for light industry, road transportation, and commuting residences since its land costs were much lower than in neighbouring Hamilton.

Fiesta Mall is a power centre type mall with Fortinos as the main anchor tenant. The mall had been a drive-in theatre that closed in 1975.

Attractions 

In addition to the Stoney Creek, and Battlefield House, the Erland Lee Museum, site of the first Women's Institute in the World, is also in Stoney Creek.

Branches of the Bruce Trail provide access to Battlefield Park as well as the Devil's Punch Bowl. The latter is marked by a large illuminated cross and offers an excellent lookout for both Stoney Creek and Hamilton. Other notable green spaces include Fifty Point Conservation Area, which includes camping and a small craft harbour. Both the Devil's Punch Bowl and the large cross mentioned above were featured in the 2006 horror film Silent Hill and can be seen during the first few scenes. Another movie filmed in the area was the 1998 film The Big Hit, starring Mark Wahlberg.

On a more commercial note, the Winona Peach Festival serves up homegrown fruit, crafts and music. Like the peach festival, the Stoney Creek Flag Festival is also held every summer. The Stoney Creek Dairy on King Street, with a stylized Battlefield Monument in its logo, offered frozen treats to people in the region for decades under a variety of ownership, the current one being Ben & Jerry's. In 2013, the former dairy was torn down for redevelopment. Eastgate Square Mall straddles the former border between Hamilton and Stoney Creek.

In 1965, the Stoney Creek Little League team became the first (and as of 2018, only) Canadian team to play in the World Championship Game. (It lost to Windsor Locks, Connecticut, 3–1.)

Government

Local jam merchant E. D. Smith promoted the area and served as a Wentworth MP around the turn of the 20th century. Otherwise, the most recent political tremor occurred when Tony Valeri, the federal minister of transport who supported Paul Martin as Liberal leader, defeated Sheila Copps, a former Canadian heritage minister who supported Jean Chrétien, in a bitter constituency nomination election after redistricting forced the two sitting MPs head-to-head in the formerly divided Hamilton East-Stoney Creek. From 2006 until 2014, Hamilton East-Stoney Creek has been represented by the New Democratic Party MP Wayne Marston, who was defeated in 2015 by former Mayor and Liberal Party candidate Bob Bratina.

Like its bigger neighbour, Stoney Creek expanded over the 20th century to encompass more and more of its smaller neighbours like Fruitland, Winona, Vinemount, Tapleytown, Tweedside and Elfrida in Saltfleet Township. The Village of Stoney Creek consolidated with Saltfleet Township in 1974 to become the Town of Stoney Creek. Areas it annexed on top of the Niagara Escarpment west of Highway 20 (now known as Upper Centennial Parkway) became known as Upper Stoney Creek or Satellite City.

In 1984, it was granted city status, and was looking to challenge its more populous neighbour. However, over its residents' strenuous objections, the City of Stoney Creek was amalgamated with Glanbrook, Ancaster, Dundas, Flamborough and Hamilton to form the new City of Hamilton. However, its suburban voters helped ensure the first mayor of an amalgamated Hamilton came from the former suburbs. The new city's second mayor, Larry Di Ianni, had served as a Stoney Creek Councillor for 20 years.

The first female mayor, as well as the last mayor of Stoney Creek, was Anne Bain.

Infrastructure
Stoney Creek is served by the Queen Elizabeth Way, various current or former Ontario provincial highways and a largely irregular network of residential streets. Portions of Upper Stoney Creek are laid out in a grid pattern. It is served by public transit in the form of the Hamilton Street Railway, or HSR, which has been operated in Stoney Creek by the regional government since 1974 and the megacity government since 2001.

References

Neighbourhoods in Hamilton, Ontario
Populated places disestablished in 2000
Former cities in Ontario